The Durand Football Tournament, commonly known as Durand Cup, is an annual domestic football competition in India which was first held in 1888 in Shimla. Hosted by the Durand Football Tournament Society (DFTS) and All India Football Federation (AIFF), the tournament is the oldest existing club football tournament in Asia and the fifth oldest national football competition in the world. The most successful teams are currently East Bengal Club and Mohun Bagan AC, accounting for 32 cup victories over the years, with 16 wins each. 

Since the inception of Federation Cup, succeeded by Super Cup, it became merely an exhibition tournament with invitational participations, but from 2022–23 it serves as the Indian football season opener, with all the Indian Super League and usually top 5 I-League clubs participating.

The tournament is named after its founder Sir Henry Mortimer Durand, the foreign secretary of India from 1884 to 1894. It was first began as a football tournament for different departments and regiments of Armed forces of India and the princely states. Since independence, the army's presence is maintained by the participation of several clubs of different regiments Indian Armed Forces as guest invitees. Army Green became the latest Army team to win the competition in 2016. At present, Bengaluru FC are the holders of the Durand Cup.

History

Foundation

The Durand Football Tournament, known as Durand Cup, was started by Sir Henry Mortimer Durand in Shimla in 1888. Sir Henry was recuperating from illness in Shimla in North India. Having become conscious of the value of sport as a means to maintain health, he decided to present a prize to encourage sporting competition in India. In 1940, the venue of the tournament was shifted to New Delhi.

British Raj era
The Durand tournament was initially a military affair, open to the British Armed Forces, the Indian Army and other armed units such as provincial frontier-security regiments and the volunteer regiments of the reserves. In practice, however, the native soldiers traditionally preferred field hockey to football, a fact which has been evident from the Indian and Pakistani dominance of that sport in international events such as the Olympics. The exception to this tradition were the Nepali men of the brigades of Gurkhas. Initially, this tended to leave the field open to the Indian Army until football's popularity took hold and it became the more universal sport it is today.

The matches were played in Dagshai, near Shimla, with the inaugural final becoming a Scottish affair, where the first name on the trophy been inscribed was the Royal Scots Fusiliers, who beat the Highland Light Infantry by 2–1. In 1940 the tournament was relocated to the capital city of New Delhi and, with most military units dispatched in World War II, the tournament was opened to civilian teams so as to maintain the level of competition, wherein Mohammedan became the first civilian team to win the tournament at the Irwin Amphitheater. The tournament would get suspended due to the war, which would soon be followed by the Indian independence movement leading to the partition of India.

Post-independence
Following the turmoil of in 1947, the Durand Cup was accidentally discovered in the office of Commander-in-Chief Sir Claude Auchinleck and efforts were made in order to shift the tournament to the newly formed Pakistan, but was strongly resisted by the Defence Secretary H.M. Patel, who acquired and stored it in the State Bank of India, ensuring that the Durand Cup remains a part of Indian football. Since then the tournament is hosted by the Durand Football Tournament Society, a registered society at Delhi, presided by the Chief of Defence Staff and chaired by the three Service Chiefs of Indian Armed Forces. At the first edition of the tournament since the independence of India, Hyderabad City Police defeated Mohun Bagan AC by 1–0 in the replayed final. For the next ten years, the trophy would go on to swap hands frequently among East Bengal Club, Mohun Bagan AC, Madras Regimental Centre and Hyderabad City Police, who played as Andhra Pradesh Police after 1960. After a year of halt due to Sino-Indian War, the tournament would get dominated by Mohun Bagan and East Bengal, with Border Security Force and JCT FC challenging their dominant run at times. In 1997, FC Kochin became the first South Indian club to get their hands on the Durand Cup.

Mahindra United FC won the first title of the 3rd millennium and their second time, following its 1998 win. In 2006, Osian's became the first civilian organisation to co-host the Durand Cup on a 5-year deal with DFTS until 2010, in order to develop the tournament and revive the interest in the game. In the following years however, clubs from Goa produced a run of winning form with clubs like Salgaocar FC, Sporting Clube de Goa, Dempo SC and Churchill Brothers FC Goa. Churchill Brothers FC Goa won the tournament thrice in 2007, 2009 and 2011, and narrowly missed a hat-trick, as runners-up in 2008. Since 2000, only twice the tournament was won by the Indian Armed Force teams– Army XI in 2005 and Army Green in 2016. In 2013, Mohammedan SC would win the tournament for the second time after 73 years and for the first time since the independence of India. Due to lack of adequate response in New Delhi, the following year Durand Cup was relocated to Goa, under the instructions of Minister of Defence Manohar Parrikar. The significance of the tournament had dissipated with time but the Indian Armed Forces kept the Durand Tournament tradition alive for decades. The tournament had been scrapped-off from the Indian football calendar a number of times without any significant reason, for instance in the years 2015, 2017 and 2018.

In 2019, the tournament was jointly organised by the Armed Forces and the Government of West Bengal, thus relocated to West Bengal in favour for higher attendance figures. In that edition, Gokulam Kerala FC became the second football club from Kerala to win the tournament. In 2020, the tournament was cancelled due to the COVID-19 pandemic. In 2021, the Armed Forces decided to host the tournament in West Bengal, jointly with the Government of West Bengal, till 2025. As the significance of the tournament depraved, usually the participating ISL clubs would field their respective reserve squads, in order to focus on the more important league games. However, at 130th edition of the tournament, organisers took an effort to revive the lost legacy and most clubs decided to field full-strength squads. FC Goa became fourth Goan club to win the tournament by defeating Mohammedan SC. The following year, AIFF decided to make Durand Cup a mandatory tournament for all ISL clubs to participate since a club must play at least 27 domestic games to be eligible for AFC competitions, therefore AFC for the first time recognised Durand Cup as one of the cup tournaments of India. Hence, in the 131st edition, for the first time, all the clubs of ISL participated in the tournament along with five invited clubs from I-League and the usual four armed force teams. Due to expansion of the competition, the matches were hosted at more than one venue, alongside Kolkata, which was unprecedented till then.

Competition format
While there is no record of the competition's format in its earlier days, currently the Durand Cup is played in two phases: round-robin and knockouts.

A total of 20 teams feature in the group stage round. Each team is allowed to have a maximum of 30 players to complete their rosters.

After the round-robin schedule, top teams from each group would progress into the knockout stage, which culminates with 2 teams facing each other in the finals.

Trophies

Unlike any other competition around the world winning team is presented with three trophies:
 Durand Cup (Nicknamed The Masterpiece): the original tournament trophy which became a rolling trophy since 1965.
 Shimla Trophy (Nicknamed The Artistry): donated by the residents of Shimla in 1904 to show their passion and support for the tournament, the trophy began to be awarded in rolling since 1965.
 President's Cup (Nicknamed The Pride): a rolling trophy that replaced the Viceroy's Trophy post-independence by the President of India Dr. Rajendra Prasad.

Finals

Results

Pre-independence era (1888–1947)

Post-independence era (1950–present)

Performance by team

Records
Most wins: 16, joint record: 
Mohun Bagan ( 1974, 1977, 1979, 1980, 1982, 1984, 1985, 1986, 1994, 2000)
East Bengal (1951, 1952, 1956, 1960, 1967, 1970, 1972, 1978, 1982, 1989, 1990, 1991, 1993, 1995, 2002, 2004)
Most consecutive wins: 4, joint record:
Mohun Bagan (1963, 1964, 1965 and 1984, 1985, 1986)
East Bengal (1989, 1990, 1991)
Highland Light Infantry (1893, 1894, 1895)
Black Watch (1897, 1898, 1899)
Most appearances: 28
Mohun Bagan (1950, 1953, 1959, 1960, 1961, 1963, 1964, 1965, 1970, 1972, 1974, 1977, 1978, 1979, 1980, 1982, 1983, 1984, 1985, 1986, 1987, 1989, 1994, 1997, 2000, 2004, 2009, 2019)
Most appearances without ever winning: 3
East Lancashire Regiment (1880, 1900, 1902)
Most appearances without ever losing: 3, joint record:
Salgaocar (1999, 2003, 2014)
South Wales Borderers (1900, 1901, 1938)
 Biggest win 
Highland Light Infantry 8–1	Shimla Rifles (2nd Punjab Volunteer Rifle Corps) (1889)
 Highest scoring: 9, joint record:
Highland Light Infantry	8–1	Shimla Rifles (2nd Punjab Volunteer Rifle Corps) (1889)
Churchill Brothers	5–4	United (2011)

See also
Indian football league system
Football in India
IFA Shield
I-League 2
State leagues

Notes

References

External links
Official website
List of past winners and runners up
List of Durand Cup Finals at RSSSF

 
Football cup competitions in India
Recurring sporting events established in 1888
1888 establishments in India
History of the Indian Army